The Hyades (Greek Ὑάδες, also known as Caldwell 41, Collinder 50, or Melotte 25) is the nearest open cluster and one of the best-studied star clusters. From the perspective of observers on Earth, the Hyades Cluster appears in the constellation Taurus, where its brightest stars form a "V" shape along with the still-brighter Aldebaran. However, Aldebaran is unrelated to the Hyades, as it is located much closer to Earth and merely happens to lie along the same line of sight.

The five brightest member stars of the Hyades have consumed the hydrogen fuel at their cores and are now evolving into giant stars. Four of these stars, with Bayer designations Gamma, Delta 1, Epsilon, and Theta Tauri, form an asterism that is traditionally identified as the head of Taurus the Bull. The fifth of these stars is Theta1 Tauri, a tight naked-eye companion to the brighter Theta2 Tauri. Epsilon Tauri, known as Ain (the "Bull's Eye"), has a gas giant exoplanet candidate, the first planet to be found in any open cluster.

The age of the Hyades is estimated to be about 625 million years. However, about one-third of confirmed member stars have been observed well outside the latter boundary, in the cluster's extended halo; these stars are probably in the process of escaping from its gravitational influence.

Location and motion 

The cluster is sufficiently close to the Sun that its distance can be directly measured by observing the amount of parallax shift of the member stars as the Earth orbits the Sun. This measurement has been performed with great accuracy using the Hipparcos satellite and the Hubble Space Telescope. An alternative method of computing the distance is to fit the cluster members to a standardized infrared color–magnitude diagram for stars of their type, and use the resulting data to infer their intrinsic brightness. Comparing this data to the brightness of the stars as seen from Earth allows their distances to be estimated. The fact that these independent measurements agree makes the Hyades an important rung on the cosmic distance ladder method for estimating the distances of extragalactic objects.

The stars of the Hyades are more enriched in heavier elements than the Sun and other ordinary stars in the solar neighborhood, with the overall cluster metallicity measured at +0.14. The Hyades Cluster is related to other stellar groups in the Sun's vicinity. Its age, metallicity, and proper motion coincide with those of the larger and more distant Praesepe Cluster, and the trajectories of both clusters can be traced back to the same region of space, indicating a common origin. Another associate is the Hyades Stream, a large collection of scattered stars that also share a similar trajectory with the Hyades Cluster. Recent results have found that at least 15% of stars in the Hyades Stream share the same chemical fingerprint as the Hyades cluster stars. However, about 85% of stars in the Hyades Stream have been shown to be completely unrelated to the original cluster on the grounds of dissimilar age and metallicity; their common motion is attributed to tidal effects of the massive rotating bar at the center of the Milky Way galaxy. Among the remaining members of the Hyades Stream, the exoplanet host star Iota Horologii has recently been proposed as an escaped member of the primordial Hyades Cluster.

The Hyades are unrelated to two other nearby stellar groups, the Pleiades and the Ursa Major Stream, which are easily visible to the naked eye under clear dark skies.

History 
Together with the other eye-catching open star cluster of the Pleiades, the Hyades form the Golden Gate of the Ecliptic, which has been known for several thousand years.

In Greek mythology, the Hyades were the five daughters of Atlas and half-sisters to the Pleiades. After the death of their brother, Hyas, the weeping sisters were transformed into a cluster of stars that was afterwards associated with rain.

As a naked-eye object, the Hyades cluster has been known since prehistoric times. It is mentioned by numerous Classical authors from Homer to Ovid. In Book 18 of the Iliad the stars of the Hyades appear along with the Pleiades, Ursa Major, and Orion on the shield that the god Hephaistos made for Achilles.

In England the cluster was known as the "April Rainers" from an association with April showers, as recorded in the folk song "Green Grow the Rushes, O".

The cluster was probably first catalogued by Giovanni Battista Hodierna in 1654, and it subsequently appeared in many star atlases of the 17th and 18th centuries. However, Charles Messier did not include the Hyades in his 1781 catalog of deep sky objects. It therefore lacks a Messier number, unlike many other, more distant open clusters – e.g., M44 (Praesepe), M45 (Pleiades), and M67.

In 1869, the astronomer R.A. Proctor observed that numerous stars at large distances from the Hyades share a similar motion through space. In 1908, Lewis Boss reported almost 25 years of observations to support this premise, arguing for the existence of a co-moving group of stars that he called the Taurus Stream (now generally known as the Hyades Stream or Hyades Supercluster). Boss published a chart that traced the scattered stars' movements back to a common point of convergence.

By the 1920s, the notion that the Hyades shared a common origin with the Praesepe Cluster was widespread, with Rudolf Klein-Wassink noting in 1927 that the two clusters are "probably cosmically related." For much of the twentieth century, scientific study of the Hyades focused on determining its distance, modeling its evolution, confirming or rejecting candidate members, and characterizing individual stars.

Morphology and evolution 
All stars form in clusters, but most clusters break up less than 50 million years after star formation concludes. The astronomical term for this process is "evaporation." Only extremely massive clusters, orbiting far from the Galactic Center, can avoid evaporation over extended timescales. As one such survivor, the Hyades Cluster probably contained a much larger star population in its infancy. Estimates of its original mass range from 800 to 1,600 times the mass of the Sun, implying still larger numbers of individual stars.

Star populations
Theory predicts that a young cluster of this size should give birth to stars and substellar objects of all spectral types, from huge, hot O stars down to dim brown dwarfs. However, studies of the Hyades show that it is deficient in stars at both extremes of mass. Extensive surveys have revealed a total of 8 white dwarfs in the cluster core, corresponding to the final evolutionary stage of its original population of B-type stars (each about ). The preceding evolutionary stage is currently represented by the cluster's four red clump giants. An additional "white giant" of type A7 III is the primary of θ² Tauri, a binary system that includes a less massive companion of spectral type A; this pair is visually associated with θ¹ Tauri, one of the four red giants, which also has an A-type binary companion.

The remaining population of confirmed cluster members includes numerous bright stars of spectral types A (at least 21), F (about 60), and G (about 50). All these star types are concentrated much more densely within the tidal radius of the Hyades than within an equivalent 10-parsec radius of the Earth. By comparison, our local 10-parsec sphere contains only 4 A stars, 6 F stars, and 21 G stars.

The Hyades' cohort of lower-mass stars – spectral types K and M – remains poorly understood, despite proximity and long observation. At least 48 K dwarfs are confirmed members, along with about a dozen M dwarfs of spectral types M0-M2. Additional M dwarfs have been proposed, but few are later than M3, and only about 12 brown dwarfs are currently reported. This deficiency at the bottom of the mass range contrasts strongly with the distribution of stars within 10 parsecs of the Solar System, where at least 239 M dwarfs are known, comprising about 76% of all neighborhood stars.

Mass segregation

The observed distribution of stellar types in the Hyades Cluster demonstrates a history of mass segregation. With the exception of its white dwarfs, the cluster's central  contain only star systems of at least . This tight concentration of heavy stars gives the Hyades its overall structure, with a core defined by bright, closely packed systems and a halo consisting of more widely separated stars in which later spectral types are common. The tidal radius of  represents the Hyades' average outer limit, beyond which a star is unlikely to remain gravitationally bound to the cluster core.

Stellar evaporation occurs in the cluster halo as smaller stars are scattered outward by more massive insiders. From the halo they may then be lost to tides exerted by the Galactic core or to shocks generated by collisions with drifting hydrogen clouds. In this way the Hyades probably lost much of its original population of M dwarfs, along with substantial numbers of brighter stars.

Stellar multiplicity
Another result of mass segregation is the concentration of binary systems in the cluster core. More than half of the known F and G stars are binaries, and these are preferentially located within this central region. As in the immediate Solar neighborhood, binarity increases with increasing stellar mass. The fraction of binary systems in the Hyades increases from 26% among K-type stars to 87% among A-type stars. Hyades binaries tend to have small separations, with most binary pairs in shared orbits whose semimajor axes are smaller than 50 astronomical units. Although the exact ratio of single to multiple systems in the cluster remains uncertain, this ratio has considerable implications for our understanding of its population. For example, Perryman and colleagues list about 200 high-probability Hyades members. If the binary fraction is 50%, the total cluster population would be at least 300 individual stars.

Future evolution
Surveys indicate that 90% of open clusters dissolve less than 1 billion years after formation, while only a tiny fraction survive for the present age of the Solar System (about 4.6 billion years). Over the next few hundred million years, the Hyades will continue to lose both mass and membership as its brightest stars evolve off the main sequence and its dimmest stars evaporate out of the cluster halo. It may eventually be reduced to a remnant containing about a dozen star systems, most of them binary or multiple, which will remain vulnerable to ongoing dissipative forces.

Brightest stars

This is a list of Hyades cluster member stars that are fourth magnitude or brighter.

In culture
The poem "Ulysses," by Alfred, Lord Tennyson, contains the line "Thro' scudding drifts the rainy Hyades// Vext the dim sea ..."

In the works of Robert W. Chambers, H. P. Lovecraft, and others, the fictional city of Carcosa is located on a planet in the Hyades.

A 2018 archaeoastronomical paper suggested that the Hyades may have inspired the Norse myth of Ragnarök. Astronomer Donald Olson questioned these findings, pointing out minor errors in the paper's astronomical data.

See also 
 List of open clusters

References

External links 

 
 Information on the Hyades from SEDS
 Astronomy Picture of the Day (2000-09-29)
 WEBDA open cluster database website for Hyades cluster – E. Paunzen (Univ. Vienna)
 Distance to the Hyades undergraduate lab  – J. Lucey (University of Durham)
 

 Hyades at Constellation Guide

 
Open clusters
Taurus (constellation)
041b